Vashi is a Village  in the state of Maharashtra, India. Administratively, Vashi is under Walwa Taluka of Sangli District in Maharashtra. Vashi is the only village in its gram panchayat.  The village of Vashi is 21 km by road south of the city of Uran Islampur and 33 km by road west of the city of Ashta.

Demographics 
In the 2001 India census, the village of Vashi had 3,332 inhabitants.  1,681 (50.5%) were males and 1,651 (49.5%) were females, for a gender ratio of 982 females per thousand males.

In the 2011 census, the village of Vashi had 3,489 inhabitants.
1008 Digambar Jain Temple is very famous pilgrim centre for Jain samaj.

Notes

Villages in Sangli district